The Algerian ambassador in Tehran is the official representative of the Government in Algiers to the Government of the Iran.

List of representatives

References 

Iran
Algeria
Ambassadors